is a passenger railway station in the city of Hitachiōmiya, Ibaraki, Japan operated by East Japan Railway Company (JR East).

Lines
Hitachi-Ōmiya Station is served by the Suigun Line, and is located 23.4 rail kilometers from the official starting point of the line at Mito Station.

Station layout
The station has two opposed side platforms connected to the station building by a level crossing. The station is staffed.

Platforms

History
Hitachi-Ōmiya Station opened on October 23, 1918 as a station on the Mito Railway which was nationalized on December 1, 1927. The station was absorbed into the JR East network upon the privatization of the Japanese National Railways (JNR) on April 1, 1987.

Passenger statistics
In fiscal 2019, the station was used by an average of 935 passengers daily (boarding passengers only).

Surrounding area

 Ōmiya Post Office

See also
List of railway stations in Japan

References

External links

  JR East Station information 

Railway stations in Ibaraki Prefecture
Suigun Line
Railway stations in Japan opened in 1918
Hitachiōmiya, Ibaraki